A subspecialty (US English) or subspeciality (international English) is a narrow field of professional knowledge/skills within a specialty of trade, and is most commonly used to describe the increasingly more diverse medical specialties.  A subspecialist is a specialist of a subspecialty.

In medicine, subspecialization is particularly common in internal medicine, cardiology, neurology and pathology, and has grown as medical practice has:
 become more complex, and
 it has become clear that a physician's case volume is negatively associated with their complication rate; that is, complications tend to decrease as the volume of cases per physician goes up.

See also

Notes and references 

Medical specialties